Platts Heath is a hamlet in the civil parish of Lenham, Kent, England.

It is also the source of the River Len, which flows in a westerly direction to join the River Medway at Maidstone.

References

Villages in Kent